Events from the year 1930 in Argentina

Incumbents
 President: Hipólito Yrigoyen (until 6 September); José Félix Uriburu (from 6 September)
 Vice President: Enrique Martínez (until 6 September); Enrique Santamarina (6 September-20 October)

Governors
 Buenos Aires Province: 
 until 1 May: Valentin Vergara 
 1 May-11 September: Nereo Crovetto
 from 11 September: Carlos Meyer Pellegrini
 Cordoba: José Antonio Ceballos; Basilio Pertiné; Carlos Ibarguren
 Mendoza Province: Carlos A. Borzani (until 7 September); Ergasto Saforcada (until 25 September); José María Rosa (from 25 September)

Events
 10 March – Goodbye Argentina (Adiós Argentina), the first Argentine film with a (musical) soundtrack, is released, giving Ada Cornaro her first starring role and Libertad Lamarque her film debut. 
 12 July – A streetcar accident occurs near Buenos Aires, when the vehicle's operator fails to notice that the moveable bridge for the tracks has been raised to allow a crossing of the Río de la Plata. The car plunges into the river and its passengers are drowned.
 6 September – 1930 Argentine coup d'état: José Félix Uriburu leads troops into Buenos Aires and carries out a military coup, ousting incumbent president Hipólito Yrigoyen.

Births
 6 January – Oscar Camilión, lawyer and diplomat (d. 2016)
 8 February – Alejandro Rey, film and TV actor and television director (d. 1987)
 6 April – Pampero Firpo, Argentinian/American professional wrestler (d. 2020)
 3 May – Juan Gelman, poet and author (d. 2014)
 2 July – Carlos Menem, President of Argentina 1989-1999 (d. 2021) (d. 2021)

Deaths

See also
List of Argentine films of 1930

References

 
Years of the 20th century in Argentina